A bunker buster is a type of munition that is designed to penetrate hardened targets or targets buried deep underground, such as military bunkers.

Armor piercing shells

Germany
Röchling shells were bunker-busting artillery shells, developed by the German engineer August Cönders, based on the theory of increasing sectional density to improve penetration. They were tested in 1942 and 1943 against the Belgian Fort d'Aubin-Neufchâteau.

Aircraft delivered bombs

World War II

Germany 
In World War II the Luftwaffe developed a series of unguided rocket-propelled armor-piercing bombs for use against shipping and fortifications.

United Kingdom

In World War II, the British designer Barnes Wallis, already famous for inventing the bouncing bomb, designed two bombs that would become the conceptual predecessors of modern bunker busters: the five tonne Tallboy and the ten tonne Grand Slam. These were "Earthquake" bombs—a concept he had first proposed in 1939. The designs were very aerodynamic, allowing them to exceed the speed of sound as they fell from 22,000 ft (6,700 m). The tails were designed with offset fins causing the bombs to spin as they fell. Using the same principle as a spinning top, this enabled them to resist being deflected, thereby improving accuracy. They had casings of high grade steel, much stronger than the typical World War II bomb so that they would survive hitting a hardened surface, or penetrate deep into the ground.

Though these bombs might be thought of as "bunker busters" today, in fact the original "earthquake" theory was more complex and subtle than simply penetrating a hardened surface. The earthquake bombs were designed not to strike a target directly, but to impact beside it, penetrate under it, and create a 'camouflet', or large buried cavern, at the same time as delivering a shock wave through the target's foundations. The target then collapses into the hole, no matter how hardened it may be. The bombs had strong casings because they needed to travel through rock rather than reinforced concrete, though they could perform equally well against hardened surfaces. In an attack on the Valentin U-Boat pens at Farge, two Grand Slams went through the 15 ft (4.5 m) reinforced concrete hardening—equalling or exceeding the best current penetration specifications.

The British Disney bomb (officially "4500 lb Concrete Piercing/Rocket Assisted bomb") was a World War II device designed to be used against U-boat pens and other super-hardened targets. Devised by Captain Edward Terrell RNVR of the Admiralty's Directorate of Miscellaneous Weapons Development, it had a streamlined hardened case and weighed about  including the rocket assembly.

For accuracy, the bombs had to be dropped precisely from a pre-determined height (usually ).

United States
Post war, the US added a form of remote guidance to the Tallboy to create the Tarzon, a 12,000-pound bomb (5,443 kg) deployed in the Korean War against an underground command center near Kanggye.

Modern

During Operation Desert Storm (1991), there was a need for a deep penetration bomb similar to the British weapons of World War II, but none of the NATO air forces had such a weapon. As a stop-gap, some were developed over a period of 28 days, using old 8 inch (203 mm) artillery barrels as casings. These bombs weighed over two tons but carried only  of high explosive. They were laser-guided and were designated "Guided Bomb Unit-28 (GBU-28)". It was proven effective for the intended role. 

An example of a Russian bunker buster is the KAB-1500L-Pr. It is delivered with the Su-24M and the Su-27IB aircraft. It is stated to be able to penetrate 10–20 m of earth or 2 m of reinforced concrete. The bomb weighs , with  being the high explosive penetrating warhead. It is laser guided and has a reported strike accuracy of  CEP.

The US has a series of custom made bombs to penetrate hardened or deeply buried structures:

More recently, the US has developed the 30,000-pound GBU-57.

Fuzing
The traditional fuze is the same as a classic armor-piercing bomb: a combination of timer and a sturdy dynamic propeller on the rear of the bomb. The fuze is armed when the bomb is released, and detonates when the propeller stops turning and the timer has expired.

Modern bunker busters may use the traditional fuze, but some also include a microphone and microcontroller. The microphone listens, and the micro controller counts floors until the bomb breaks through the desired numbers of floors.

ATK is working on a Hard Target Void Sensing Fuze (HTVSF) for  weapons to explode when they reach an open space in a deeply buried bunker.

Missiles 

The extra speed provided by a rocket motor enables greater penetration of a missile-mounted bunker buster warhead. To reach maximum penetration (impact depth), the warhead may consist of a high-density projectile only. Such a warhead carries more energy than a warhead with chemical explosives (kinetic energy of a projectile at hypervelocity).

Nuclear 

The nuclear bunker buster is the nuclear weapon version of the bunker buster. The non-nuclear component of the weapon is designed to greatly enhance the penetration into soil, rock, or concrete to deliver a nuclear warhead to a target. These weapons would be used to destroy hardened, underground military bunkers deeply buried. In theory, the amount of radioactive nuclear fallout would be reduced from that of a standard, air-burst nuclear detonation because they would have relatively low explosive yield. However, because such weapons necessarily come into contact with large amounts of earth-based debris, they may, under certain circumstances, still generate significant fallout. Warhead yield and weapon design have changed periodically throughout the history of the design of such weapons. An underground explosion releases a larger fraction of its energy into the ground, compared to an explosion at or above the surface which releases most of its energy into the atmosphere.

See also
 T-12 Cloudmaker
 Disney bomb
 Rochling shell

Notes

References
  "Running parallel with the development of large bombs was a project for obtaining high striking velocities by means of a rocket assisted 4,500-lb British bomb called the Disney. (...) As early as June 1945, the concrete V-weapon structure at Watten was used as a target".
  Figure 280, p. 558, provides a detailed diagram of the Disney bomb (with its internals).

Further reading
 
 
  US rocket-boosted submunition against runways and hardened aircraft shelters.

External links 
 Guided Bomb Unit-28 (GBU-28) BLU-113 Penetrator
 BBC: 'Bunker buster' missiles aim at Moon
 Annotated bibliography for nuclear bunker buster bombs from the Alsos Digital Library for Nuclear Issues
Read Congressional Research Service (CRS) Reports regarding Bunker Busters
 Video against usage (produced by Union of Concerned Scientists)
 (Project spider; Massive natural passive defense against air raid by anna farahmand)
Video of bunker buster bomb in action
Tunnel buster bomb
Bunker buster

Aerial bombs
Anti-fortification weapons